"A Little Past Little Rock" is a song written by Brett Jones, Tony Lane and Jess Brown, and recorded by American country music artist Lee Ann Womack.  It was released in June 1998 as the first single from her album Some Things I Know.  The song peaked at number 2 on the U.S. Billboard Hot Country Singles & Tracks chart, behind "Wide Open Spaces" by the Dixie Chicks, her third song to just miss the top spot.

Content
"A Little Past Little Rock" is a mid-tempo ballad, backed by percussion with harmonica and fiddle. The narrator describes driving down a highway not caring where it takes her, but she is satisfied knowing she's headed away from her troubled relationship. The song features a backing vocal from Womack's ex-husband, Jason Sellers.

Music video
A music video was released for the song, directed by Thom Oliphant. In the video, Womack is shown driving down the highway in a Jeep at night. The entire video is done in black and white.

Critical reception
Editors at Billboard gave the song a positive review and wrote, "Womack continues her career ascent with another solid country single. The song is laced with fiddle and sensuous lead guitar work. Wright's production is textured and keenly complements Womack's lump-in-the-throat vocals. The song is well-crafted, and Womack delivers an emotion-laden vocal performance that's sure to win even more friends at country radio. Womack sets the standard for country female vocalists in the '90s with this winning little confection."

Chart performance

Year-end charts

References

1998 singles
Lee Ann Womack songs
Country ballads
MCA Nashville Records singles
Song recordings produced by Mark Wright (record producer)
1998 songs
Songs written by Jess Brown
Songs written by Brett Jones (songwriter)
Songs written by Tony Lane (songwriter)
Songs about Arkansas